The  was located in the northwestern part of Honshu, the main island of Japan. It lay along the Sea of Japan within the Chūbu region, which it is currently a part of. It is almost equivalent to Koshi Province and Hokurikudō area in pre-modern Japan. Since the Heian period until the Edo period the region was a core recipient of population, the population grew to be much larger proportionately than it is today, despite the rural character.  With the growth of urban centers in the 20th century, particularly Tokyo and Chūkyō, the Hokuriku has steadily declined in importance to become relative backwaters.  The region is also known for traditional culture that originated from elsewhere that has been long lost along the Taiheiyō Belt.

The Hokuriku region includes the four prefectures of Ishikawa, Fukui, Niigata and Toyama, although Niigata is sometimes included in one of the following regions:

 : includes Niigata and Nagano prefectures
 : includes Niigata, Nagano and Yamanashi prefectures
 : includes both the Hokuriku and Shin'etsu regions

Major cities
The major population centers of Hokuriku are:

Niigata (designated city)
Kanazawa, Toyama, Fukui (core cities)
Jōetsu, Nagaoka (special cities)
Of these, Niigata is the largest with a population of over 800,000.

Industries
The main industries in the Hokuriku area include chemicals, medicine, tourism, textiles and textile machinery, heavy machinery, farming, and fishing. Koshihikari, a popular variety of rice is a special product of Hokuriku subregion.

Demographics 
Per Japanese census data, Hokuriku subregion has had negative population growth since year 2000.

Climate

The Hokuriku region has the highest volume of snowfall of any inhabited and arable region in the world. This is because dry Siberian air masses, which develop high humidity over the Sea of Japan, are forced upwards when they encounter the mountains of Honshū, causing the humidity to condense as snow.

The long winters and deep snow of this region are depicted in Hokuetsu Seppu, an encyclopedic work of the late Edo period which describes life in the Uonuma district of Niigata Prefecture.

The Hokuriku region is also the setting for Yasunari Kawabata's novel Snow Country.

Tourism
The region has seen an influx of tourists since 2015 as the Hokuriku Shinkansen (formerly Nagano Shinkansen) extended its services from Nagano to Kanazawa, enabling direct bullet train services to the Hokuriku region from Tokyo. When services commenced in March 2015, the travel time from Tokyo to Toyama was reduced to about 2 hours, with Kanazawa an additional 30 minutes away.

See also
 Hokuriku dialect
 Hokuriku Expressway
 Hokuriku Main Line
 Hokuriku Shinkansen
 Kitamaebune
 Kōshin'etsu region
 Shin'etsu region
 Tōhoku region
 Tōkai region

References

Citations 
 Nussbaum, Louis-Frédéric and Käthe Roth (2005).  Japan Encyclopedia. Cambridge, Massachusetts: Harvard University Press. . , .

 
Chūbu region